In enzymology, a 2-isopropylmalate synthase is an enzyme that catalyzes the chemical reaction

acetyl-CoA + 3-methyl-2-oxobutanoate + H2O  (2S)-2-isopropylmalate + CoA

The three substrates of this enzyme are acetyl-CoA, 3-methyl-2-oxobutanoate, and H2O, and its products are (2S)-2-isopropylmalate and CoA.

The enzyme belongs to the family of transferases, specifically those acyltransferases that convert acyl groups into alkyl groups on transfer.  The systematic name of this enzyme class is acetyl-CoA:3-methyl-2-oxobutanoate C-acetyltransferase (thioester-hydrolysing, carboxymethyl-forming). Other names in common use include 3-carboxy-3-hydroxy-4-methylpentanoate 3-methyl-2-oxobutanoate-lyase, (CoA-acetylating), alpha-isopropylmalate synthetase, alpha-isopropylmalate synthase, alpha-isopropylmalic synthetase, isopropylmalate synthase, and isopropylmalate synthetase.  This enzyme participates in biosynthesis of L-leucine and pyruvate metabolism. Monovalent and divalent cation activation have been reported for enzymes from different sources.

Mycobacterium tuberculosis α-isopropylmalate synthase requires a divalent metal ion, of which Mg2+ and Mn2+ give highest activity, and a monovalent cation, with K+ as the best activator. Zn2+ was shown to be an inhibitor, contrary to what was assumed from the structural data. Another feature of the M. tuberculosis homolog is that L-leucine, the feedback inhibitor, inhibits the enzyme in a time-dependent fashion. This was the first demonstration of a feedback inhibitor that displays slow-onset inhibition.

Structural studies

As of late 2007, only one structure has been solved for this class of enzymes, with the PDB accession code .

References

EC 2.3.3
Potassium enzymes
Enzymes of known structure